Aa hieronymi is a species of orchid in the genus Aa.

It is found in northwestern Argentina.

References

hieronymi
Plants described in 1912
Taxa named by Alfred Cogniaux